Qalandia checkpoint at Qalandia is the primary Israel Defense Forces checkpoint between the northern West Bank and Jerusalem. It is known for frequent demonstrations against the occupation. The checkpoint is used by the Israeli military to control Palestinian access to East Jerusalem and Israel. Israel requires Palestinians to have permits to pass through the checkpoint to East Jerusalem and Israel for their work, medical care, education or for religious reasons. According to B'Tselem, most of the people who use the checkpoint are residents of East Jerusalem separated from the city by the Israeli West Bank barrier.

See also
 Palestinian freedom of movement

References

West Bank
Israeli–Palestinian conflict
Checkpoints